Helena Brodin (born 11 June 1936) is a Swedish actress. She appeared in more than 40 films and television shows between 1960 and 2000.

Selected filmography
 Hugo and Josephine (1967)
 I Am Maria (1979)
 Der Mann, der sich in Luft auflöste (1980)
 Peter-No-Tail (1981)
 Spring of Joy (1993)

References

External links

1936 births
Living people
20th-century Swedish actresses
21st-century Swedish actresses
Swedish film actresses
Swedish television actresses
Actresses from Stockholm